Oratory Youths Football Club is a football club from the Maltese Isle of Gozo, from the capital of Victoria. The club was previously called the Salesian Youths founded in 1946, in relation to the Roman Catholic religious order Salesians of Don Bosco. The club was then renamed Oratory Youths but between the years 1978 and 1989 the club changed its name to Calypsian Bosco Youths before returning to the former and current name Oratory Youths. The club has won the Gozo Football League top division six times.

Honours
Gozo First Division
Champions (6): 1948–49, 1952–53, 1956–57, 1957–58, 1958–59, 1959–60
Gozo Football Association Cup
Winners (1):1985-1986
Gozo Second Division
Champions (4): 1948–49 (competed in both the 1st and 2nd div league), 1970–1971, 1979–80, 2012–13
2nd Division Knock Out
Winners (2):1991-92, 1994–95

Cups from the Past
Liberty Cup
Winners (1):1952-53
Coronation Cup
Winners (1):1952-53
Galea Cup
Winners (Unofficial Statistic) (5):1951-1952, 1956–57, 1958–59, 1970–71, 1971–72
Dingli Cup
Winners (Unofficial Statistic) (2):1956-1957, 1958–59
MG Cup
Winners (1):1959-60
Victoria Shield
Winners (1):2002

Senior Squad for Season 2021–22

Out on Loan

Current Coaching staff

Manager – Michael Vella

Goalkeeper Coach –  Victor Agius

Youth Team Manager –  John Mark Vella

Club Doctor –  Dr. Christopher Micallef M.D.

Kit Manager –  Louis Buhagiar

Current club Officials

Club chairman:
Mr. Joseph Micallef

Club Secretary:
Mr. David Galea

Club Financial Controller:
Mr. Mario Scicluna

Members:

Mr. Ryan Cefai Mercieca

Mr. George Farrugia

Mr. Gordon John Grech

Dr. Christopher Micallef M.D.

Youth Section Honours
Under 18
Under 18 League
Champions (1): 2012–2013

Under 14
APS Under 14 Football League
Champions (1): 2008–2009
APS Under 14 Knock Out Cup
Winners (1):2008-2009

External links
Official Website

Football clubs in Malta
Gozitan football clubs
1946 establishments in Malta
Victoria, Gozo